Lees Camp (also Lee's Camp) is an unincorporated community in Tillamook County, Oregon, United States. It is near the summit of the Northern Oregon Coast Range.

Lees Camp was established by Rex Lee, who in 1939 bought  of land on the Wilson River near the mouth of the North Fork from the Reeher family. Lee developed the place as a tourist and sportsmen's camp called Lee's Wilson River Camp. In 1947, a post office with the name Lee's Camp was established. It was nearly in the same location as an earlier post office named Wilson, which ran from 1896 to 1917, with mail to Gales Creek. Wilson post office served the Glenora station of the United States Weather Bureau. The name Glenora was unacceptable to the Post Office Department for the name of the post office because of possible confusion with places such as Glenwood and Glendale. Lee's Camp post office closed in 1977; the community is now served by the Tillamook post office.

The Lees Camp Store, founded in the 1930s, serves as a travelers' landmark and focal point for area residents.

As of October 2010, Lees Camp holds the record for most rainfall in 24 hours in Oregon:  on November 6, 2006.

References

External links
Images of Lees Camp from Flickr
TripCheck road cam at Lees Camp from Oregon Department of Transportation
History of Glenora weather station from the Tillamook Forest Center

Unincorporated communities in Tillamook County, Oregon
1947 establishments in Oregon
Unincorporated communities in Oregon